SS Minas was an Italian troopship which was sunk on 15 February 1917 off Cape Matapan. Eight hundred seventy people were killed.

SS Minas was a passenger ship built in 1891 by Gio. Ansaldo & C. in Genoa, Italy, and operated by Angelo Parodi.

She could carry 60 passengers in first class and 900 in third class. Until she was requisitioned for use as a troopship during World War I, she travelled mainly between Genoa and South America.

On 15 February 1917, the ship was in the Mediterranean Sea steaming from Taranto, Italy, to Salonika, Greece, when she was attacked near Cape Matapan by the Imperial German Navy submarine  under the command of Walter Forstmann. On board were Italian, Serbian, and French soldiers on their way to the Salonika front. The ship was also carrying weapons and ammunition, which exploded when two torpedoes hit the ship. This caused the ship to sink very quickly, killing 870 people. Eleven crew members and 315 Italian soldiers were among the dead. One of the lost soldiers was Vittorio Locchi, a young Florentine poet, who had written The Feast of Santa Gorizia in 1916. It was also rumored that the ship carried 25 boxes of gold bullion.

References 

World War I passenger ships of Italy
World War I naval ships of Italy
World War I shipwrecks in the Mediterranean Sea
Ships sunk by German submarines in World War I
Maritime incidents in 1917
1891 ships
Ships built in Genoa
Ships built by Gio. Ansaldo & C.